Dr. Minx is a 1975 sexploitation film, directed by Hikmet Avedis and starring Edy Williams and Randy Boone.

Plot
Dr. Carol Evans (Edy Williams), a physician who recently conspired with her lover Gus (William Smith) to kill her rich husband for his inheritance, finds herself being blackmailed by him for a share of the money. Carol seduces Brian (Randy Boone), a young motorcycle-accident patient of hers, in the hope that he’ll help her kill Gus. When Gus is killed in a struggle, Carol coerces him into hiding the body, but finds herself being investigated by Brian's friend David (Harvey Jason), an amateur sleuth, who has always believed her to be a murderer.

Cast
Edy Williams as Dr. Carol Evans
Randy Boone as Brian Thomas
Harvey Jason as David Brown
Marlene Schmidt as Harriet Thomas
William Smith as Gus Dolan
Alvy Moore as Sheriff Frank
Charles Knapp as Bill Brown
Chuck Boyd as Fred Thomas
Maggie Appel as Mabel Brown

See also
 List of American films of 1975

References

External links
Dr. Minx trailer at YouTube

Dr Minx at TCMDB

1975 films
American sexploitation films
1975 comedy-drama films
American comedy-drama films
1975 comedy films
1975 drama films
1970s English-language films
1970s American films